Arquitecturas Bis was a Spanish bimonthly architecture magazine which was published in Barcelona, Spain, between 1974 and 1985. Its subtitle was información gráfica de actualidad (Spanish: current graphic information).

History and profile
Arquitecturas Bis was launched in Barcelona in 1974. The founders were writer Rosa Regàs, architect Oriol Bohigas and graphic designer Enric Satué. Regàs also served as the editor-in-chief and was the owner of La Gaya Ciencia, the publisher of the magazine which appeared on a bimonthly basis.

The magazine editors were mostly Catalans who included Federico Correa, Lluís Domènech, Rafael Moneo, Helio Piñón, Manuel de Solà-Morales and Tomás Llorens. Luis Peña Ganchegui later became a member of the editorial board. In 1977 Fernando Villavecchia began to work for the magazine as the secretary of the editorial board. It contained news, notes, theoretical writings, historical essays, criticism and books reviews. Arquitecturas Bis focused on architecture-related topics, but also featured articles dealing with the question of aesthetic in a critical manner. 

The magazine folded in 1985 after producing a total of 32 single and 10 doubles issues.

References

1974 establishments in Catalonia
1985 disestablishments in Spain
Architecture magazines
Defunct magazines published in Spain
Magazines established in 1974
Magazines disestablished in 1985
Magazines published in Barcelona
Spanish-language magazines
Bi-monthly magazines published in Spain